Quiéreme Tal Como Soy (Eng.: Love Me As I Am) is the eighteenth studio album by singer Lucero. It was released in September 2006. The album contains reworked versions of some of her greatest hits written by Rafael Pérez Botija and covers of music by Rocío Dúrcal, Mocedades and José José (also written by Pérez-Botija). 
On 29 November 2006 the album was certified in Mexico as gold album, after selling 100,000 copies only in Mexico.

Track listing
The album is composed by twelve songs, all of them were arranged and composed by Rafael Perez Botija.

Singles

Album certification

Awards
It received two nominations in the Orgullosamente Latino Awards, one for Latin Album of the Year, but lost to RBD's "Celestial" and the other for Best Female Singer, losing to Olga Tañón. It was also nominated for Best Balladeer in Lunas del Auditorio Awards, award that was given to Emmanuel.

Release history
This album was released in 3 formats: 
 Digipack case for Mexican edition (September 2006)
 Normal case for USA edition (November 2006)
 Digital release

References

2006 albums
Lucero (entertainer) albums